Rapsodi is the debut studio album by Nigerian rapper Olamide, released by Coded Tunes. The album features guest appearances from Pheelz, Wizkid, 9ice, Reminisce, I.D Cabasa, 2Phat, Adol, Ab1, Jumoke, Lord of Ajasa, B-Rank, Soul Joe, and Terry Da Rapman. It was nominated for Best Rap Album at The Headies 2012.

Accolades
Rapsodi was nominated for Best Rap Album at The Headies 2012.

Track listing

References

2011 albums
Olamide albums